In classical mechanics, the Hannay angle is a mechanics analogue of the whirling geometric phase (or Berry phase). It was named after John Hannay of the University of Bristol, UK. Hannay first described the angle in 1985, extending the ideas of the recently formalized Berry phase to classical mechanics.

Hannay angle in classical mechanics 
The Hannay angle is defined in the context of action-angle coordinates. In an initially time-invariant system, an action variable  is a constant. After introducing a periodic perturbation , the action variable  becomes an adiabatic invariant, and the Hannay angle  for its corresponding angle variable can be calculated according to the path integral that represents an evolution in which the perturbation  gets back to the original value

Example

The Foucault pendulum is an example from classical mechanics that is sometimes also used to illustrate the Berry phase. Below we study the Foucault pendulum using action-angle variables. For simplicity, we will avoid using the Hamilton-Jacobi equation, which is employed in the general protocol.

Here, the  direction points from the center of the Earth to the pendulum. The Lagrangian for the pendulum is

The corresponding motion equation is

We then introduce an auxiliary variable  that is in fact an angle variable. We now have an equation for : 

From its characteristic equation

we obtain its characteristic root (we note that )

The solution is then

The first term is due to dynamic effect of the pendulum and is termed as the dynamic phase, while the second term representing a geometric phase that is essentially the Hannay angle

References 

 Hannay John H. 1985 Angle variable holonomy in adiabatic excursion of an integrable Hamiltonian J. Phys. A: Math. Gen. 18 221–30.

External links
Professor John H. Hannay: Research Highlights. Department of Physics, University of Bristol.

Classical mechanics